Yetvart Tomasyan (born 1949, Istanbul) is a Turkish-Armenian publisher who founded  in 1993.

References

Sources

1949 births
Living people
Businesspeople from Istanbul
Turkish people of Armenian descent